The Canadian Private Copying Collective is a Canadian non-profit/non-government organization created in 1999 to collect and distribute private copying royalties in the music industry. The organization represents songwriters, recording artists, music publishers and recording companies. Issues are brought before the Copyright Board of Canada.

External links
 Canadian Private Copying Collective website

Canadian copyright law
Music licensing organizations
Organizations established in 1999
1999 establishments in Canada